Jawi (Kelantan-Pattani: Yawi) is a writing system used for writing several languages of Southeast Asia, such as Acehnese, Banjarese, Kerinci, Maguindanaon, Malay, Minangkabau, Tausūg, and Ternate. Jawi is based on the Arabic script, consisting of all of the original 31 Arabic letters, and six additional letters constructed to fit the phonemes native to Malay, and an additional phoneme used in foreign loanwords, but not found in Classical Arabic, which are ca, nga, pa, ga, va, and nya.

Jawi was developed from the advent of Islam in the Maritime Southeast Asia, supplanting the earlier Brahmic scripts used during Hindu-Buddhist era. The oldest evidence of Jawi writing can be found on the 14th century Terengganu Inscription Stone, recorded in Classical Malay language that contains a mixture of Malay, Sanskrit and Arabic vocabularies. There are two competing theories on the origin of the Jawi alphabet. Popular theory suggests that the system was developed and derived directly from the Arabic script, while scholars like R. O. Windstedt suggest that it was developed through the influence of Perso-Arabic alphabet.

The ensuing trade expansions and the spread of Islam to other areas of Southeast Asia from the 15th century had brought the Jawi alphabet beyond the traditional Malay-speaking world. Until the 20th century, Jawi remained as the standard script of the Malay language. The use of Jawi heralded the birth of traditional Malay literature, when it was featured prominently in the royal correspondences, religious texts and literary publications. With the arrival of Western influence through colonization and education, Jawi was relegated to scripts for religious education, with the Malay language eventually adopting the Latin alphabet called Rumi in general usage.

Today, Jawi is one of the two official scripts in Brunei. In Malaysia, the position of Jawi is protected under Section 9 of the National Language Act 1963/1967, as it retains a degree of official use in religious and cultural administration. In some states, most notably Kelantan, Terengganu and Pahang, Jawi attained the co-official script status, where businesses are mandated to adopt Jawi signages and billboards. Jawi is also used as an alternative script among Malay communities in Indonesia and Thailand.

Until the early 20th century, there was no uniform spelling system for Jawi. The earliest orthographic reform to develop a standard spelling was in 1937 by The Malay Language and Johor Royal Literary Book Pact. This was followed by another reform by Za'aba published in 1949. The final major reform was in 1986 under the name 'Enhanced Guidelines of Jawi Spelling' which made Za'aba Spelling as its basis.  Jawi can be typed using the Jawi keyboard.

Etymology

According to Kamus Dewan, "Jawi" is a term synonymous to 'Malay'. The term has been used interchangeably with 'Malay' in other terms including Bahasa Jawi or Bahasa Yawi (Kelantan-Pattani Malay, a Malay dialect used in Southern Thailand), Masuk Jawi (literally "to become Malay", referring to the practice of circumcision to symbolise the coming of age), and Jawi pekan or Jawi Peranakan (literally 'Malay of the town' or 'Malay born of', referring to the Malay-speaking Muslims of mixed Malay and Indian ancestry). With verb-building circumfixes men-...-kan, menjawikan (literally 'to make something Malay'), also refers to the act of translating a foreign text into Malay language. The word Tulisan Jawi that means "Jawi script" is another derivative that carries the meaning 'Malay script'.

Early history

Prior to the onset of Islamisation, the Pallava script, Nagari, and old Sumatran scripts were used in writing the Malay language. This is evidenced from the discovery of several stone inscriptions in Old Malay, notably the Kedukan Bukit inscription and Talang Tuo inscription. The spread of Islam in Southeast Asia and the subsequent introduction of Arabic writing system began with the arrival of Muslim merchants in the region since the seventh century. Among the oldest archaeological artefacts inscribed with Arabic script are; a tombstone of Syeikh Rukunuddin dated 48 AH (668/669 CE) in Barus, Sumatra; a tombstone dated 290 AH (910 CE) on the mausoleum of Syeikh Abdul Qadir Ibn Husin Syah Alam located in Alor Setar, Kedah; a tombstone found in Pekan, Pahang dated 419 AH (1026 CE); a tombstone discovered in Phan Rang, Vietnam dated 431 AH (1039 CE); a tombstone dated 440 AH (1048 CE) found in Bandar Seri Begawan, Brunei; and a tombstone of Fatimah Binti Maimun Bin Hibat Allah found in Gresik, East Java dated 475 AH (1082 CE). Islam was spread from the coasts to the interior of the island and generally in a top-down process in which rulers were converted and then introduced more or less orthodox versions of Islam to their peoples. The conversion of King Phra Ong Mahawangsa of Kedah in 1136 and King Merah Silu of Samudra Pasai in 1267 were among the earliest examples.

At the early stage of Islamisation, the Arabic script was taught to the people who had newly embraced Islam in the form of religious practices, such as the recitation of Quran as well as salat. The Arabic script was accepted by the Malay community together with their acceptance of Islam and was adapted to suit spoken Classical Malay. Six letters were added for sounds not found in Arabic: ca, pa, ga, nga, va and nya. Some Arabic letters are rarely used as they represent sounds not present in modern Malay however may be used to reflect the original spelling of Arabic loanwords. The sounds represented by these letters may be assimilated into sounds found in Malay's native phoneme inventory or in some instances appear unchanged. Like the other Arabic scripts, some letters are obligatorily joined while some are never joined. This was the same for the acceptance of Arabic writing in Turkey, Persia and India which had taken place earlier and thus, the Jawi script was then deemed as the writing of the Muslims.

The oldest remains of Malay using the Jawi script have been found on the Terengganu Inscription Stone, dated 702 AH (1303 CE), nearly 600 years after the date of the first recorded existence of Arabic script in the region. The inscription on the stone contains a proclamation issued by the "Sri Paduka Tuan" of Terengganu, urging his subjects to "extend and uphold" Islam and providing 10 basic Sharia laws for their guidance. This has attested the strong observance of the Muslim faith in the early 14th century Terengganu specifically and the Malay world as a whole.

The development of Jawi script was different from that of Pallava writing which was exclusively restricted to the nobility and monks in monasteries. The Jawi script was embraced by the entire Muslim community regardless of class. With the increased intensity in the appreciation of Islam, scriptures originally written in Arabic were translated in Malay and written in the Jawi script. Additionally local religious scholars later began to elucidate the Islamic teachings in the forms of original writings. Moreover, there were also individuals of the community who used Jawi for the writing of literature which previously existed and spread orally. With this inclusion of written literature, Malay literature took on a more sophisticated form. This was believed to have taken place from the 15th century and lasted right up to the 19th century.
Other forms of Arabic-based scripts existed in the region, notably the Pegon alphabet used for Javanese in Java and the Serang alphabet used for Buginese in South Sulawesi. Both writing systems applied extensive use of Arabic diacritics and added several letters which were formed differently from Jawi letters to suit the languages. Due to their fairly limited usage, the spelling system of both scripts did not undergo similar advanced developments and modifications as experienced by Jawi.

The spread and extent of Jawi script

The script became prominent with the spread of Islam, supplanting the earlier writing systems. The Malays held the script in high esteem as it is the gateway to understanding Islam and its Holy Book, the Quran. The use of Jawi script was a key factor driving the emergence of Malay as the lingua franca of the region, alongside the spread of Islam. It was widely used in the Sultanate of Malacca, Sultanate of Johor, Sultanate of Brunei, Sultanate of Sulu, Sultanate of Pattani, the Sultanate of Aceh to the Sultanate of Ternate in the east as early as the 15th century. The Jawi script was used in royal correspondences, decrees, poems and was widely understood by the merchants in the port of Malacca as the main means of communication. Early legal digests such as the Undang-Undang Melaka Code and its derivatives including the Codes of Johor, Perak, Brunei, Kedah, Pattani and Aceh were written in this script. It is the medium of expression of kings, nobility and the religious scholars. It is the traditional symbol of Malay culture and civilisation. Jawi was used not only amongst the ruling class, but also the common people. The Islamisation and Malayisation of the region popularised Jawi into a dominant script.

Royal correspondences for example are written, embellished and ceremoniously delivered. Examples of royal correspondences still in the good condition are the letter between Sultan Hayat of Ternate and King John III of Portugal (1521), the letter from Sultan Iskandar Muda of Acèh Darussalam to King James I of England (1615), and the letter from Sultan Abdul Jalil IV of Johor to King Louis XV of France (1719). Many literary works such as epics, poetry and prose use the Jawi script. It is the pinnacle of the classic Malay civilisation. Historical epics such as the Malay Annals, as listed by UNESCO under Memories of the World, are among the countless epics written by the Malay people. The Sufic poems by Hamzah Fansuri and many others contributed to the richness and depth of the Malay civilisation. Jawi script was the official script for the Unfederated Malay States when they were British protectorates.

Jawi today

Today, Jawi is one of the official scripts of Brunei. In Malaysia, it is used for religious and cultural administration in the states of Terengganu, Kelantan, Kedah, Perlis, Penang, Pahang and Johor. Various efforts were in place to revive the Jawi script in Malaysia and Brunei due to its role in the Malay and Islamic spheres. Jawi scripts are also seen at the rear of Malaysian ringgit and Brunei dollar banknotes. The Malays in Patani still use Jawi today for the same reasons.

In Malaysia 
In August 2019, the Malaysian Government's plans to introduce the teaching of Jawi at the most basic level in ethnic Chinese and Tamil vernacular schools attracted opposition from ethnic Chinese and Indian education groups, which claimed that the move would lead to an Islamization of the Malaysian education system. The Chinese educationist group Dong Jiao Zong organised a conference calling on the Malaysian Government to rescind its decision in late December 2019. Perhaps fearing violence, the Malaysian Police obtained a court injunction against it on the grounds that it would trigger ethnic tensions.

The state government of Kedah in Malaysia has long defended the use of Jawi in the state. The Menteri Besar of Kedah has denied the allegation that the state government was trying to create an Islamic state ambience by promoting the use of Jawi in 2008, saying that it is a normal occurrence evidenced by Chinese coffeeshops and pawnshops having signboards written in Jawi. This can further be seen later on when the Kedah state government has shown its support with Johor state government's move to use Jawi in official matters in 2019. The exco of local authority of the state of Kedah had also stated that the Jawi script in billboards in Kedah is not forbidden, but rather recommended. He claims that the recommendation to use Jawi script has been gazetted in the state law, and that it has been part of the state identity to have billboards in Jawi script in addition to other scripts. He also stated that there are high demands in incorporating Jawi script in billboards in Kedah.

Kuantan, the state capital of Pahang in Malaysia has introduced the usage of Jawi in all signages across the city from 1 August 2019. This was done after a recommendation from the Yang di-Pertuan Agong, who was then the Regent of Pahang, to uphold the usage of the writing system. The Pahang state government has since expanded the order and made it mandatory for every signage state-wide including road signs to display Jawi alongside other scripts from 1 January 2020 after being delayed a few times. Premises that fail to comply with this order will be fined up to a maximum of RM250, with the possibility of revocation of their business licences if they still do not comply afterwards. In the early stage, usage of Jawi stickers are allowed to put on existing signage instead of replacing the whole signage.

In Indonesia 
Indonesia, having multiple regional and native languages, uses the Latin script for writing its own standard of Malay in general. Nonetheless, the Jawi script does have a regional status in native Malay areas such as Riau, Riau archipelago, Jambi, South Sumatra (i.e Palembang Malay language), Aceh, and Kalimantan (i.e Banjar language). This is due to the fact that regional and native languages are compulsory studies in the basic education curriculum of each region (examples include Javanese for Javanese regions, Sundanese for Sundanese regions, Madurese for Maduranese regions, and Jawi for Malay regions). Jawi script is widely used in Riau and Riau Island province, where road signs and government building signs are written in this script. A sister variant of Jawi known as Pegon is used to write Javanese, Sundanese, and Madurese and is still widely used in traditional religious schools across Java, but has been supplanted in common writing by the Latin alphabet and, in some cases, Javanese script and Sundanese script.

Letters

 Letters with no initial and middle forms adopt either isolated or final form, because they cannot be joined with suffixing letter.
 The letter hamzah may also appear in its three-quarter form "" (hamzah tiga suku), above alif "أ", below alif "إ" or housed (above ya "ئ" or wau "ؤ").[e]

Spelling
Modern Jawi spelling is based on the Daftar Kata Bahasa Melayu (DKBM): Rumi-Sebutan-Jawi dictionary. Older texts may use different spellings for some words. Nonetheless, even different modern sources may use different spelling conventions; they may differ especially in the usage of the mater lectionis (alif "ا", wau "و" and ya "ي") and the hamzah tiga suku "", as well as in the spelling of vowels and consonant clusters in loanwords from English. One source tends to use the following conventions; there are numerous exceptions to them nonetheless.

 Loanwords may be spelled differently. Particularly, loanwords from Arabic often keep their original spellings.

 The letters sa "ث", ha "ح", kha "خ", zal "ذ", sad "ص", dad "ض", ta "ط", za "ظ", ain "ع", ghain "غ", ta marbutah "ة" are mostly used to spell Arabic loanwords, e.g. Selasa "ثلاث", huruf "حروف", khabar "خبر", beza "بيذا", fasal "فصل", darurat "ضرورة", talak "طلاق", zohor "ظهر", saat "ساعة", ghaib "غيب", sunat "سنة", khasiat " خصية". The letter va "ۏ" is mostly used to spell English loanwords, e.g. universiti "اونيۏرسيتي". The letters zai "ز", syin "ش", fa "ف", ye "ى" are mostly used to spell loanwords from English or Arabic e.g. zoo "زو", zapin "زاڤين", syif "شيف", syukur "شکور", filem "فيلم", fakir "فقير", nasionalisme "ناسيوناليسمى", takwa "تقوى".

 Rumi x used to spell loanwords from English may be spelled using different Jawi letters, depending on pronunciation, e.g. kaf-sin "کس" in X-ray "ايکس-راي", zai "ز" in xenon "زينون".

 The letter syin "ش" is also used to represent "sh" especially for words derived from Classical Malay language, e.g. "مهاريشي" maharishi; and loanwords, e.g. "شيرڤا" Sherpa.

 Native Malay root morphemes with Rumi k in the syllable coda are pronounced [ʔ] and are written with qaf "ق", e.g. tengok "تيڠوق", laksa, "لقسا", baiklah "بايقله", kotakku "کوتقکو", kotakmu "کوتقمو". Loanwords from English with Rumi k are spelled with kaf "ک", e.g. klinik "کلينيک", teksi "تيکسي".

 The letter fa "ف" was historically used to represent /p/ (Jawi: pa "ڤ") and such usage may still be found in archaic Jawi spellings. This is because /f/ is a non-native consonant in Malay found only in loanwords and in the past was often approximated as a /p/.

 Though there are exceptions, vowels and diphthongs tend to be spelled this way:

  When spelling vowels, there are many exceptions to the conventions stated above and below. Common exceptions include ada "اد", di "د", dia "دي" dan "دان", ia "اي", jika "جک", juga "جوݢ", lima "ليم", ke "ک", kita "کيت", mereka "مريک", ini "اين", itu "ايت", pada "ڤد", suka "سوک" and tiga "تيݢ".
  Some words spelled distinctly in Rumi may be homographs in Jawi, e.g. sembilan and sambilan are both "سمبيلن", markah and merekah are both "مرکه", sesi and sisi are both "سيسي", biro and biru are both "بيرو", borong and burung are both "بوروڠ", golong and gulung are both "ݢولوڠ".
  Using or omitting alif "ا" when representing /a/ in closed syllables and in the last letter of a root morpheme:

 When representing /a/, alif "ا" is mostly omitted in CVC-syllables.

 However, it is usually not omitted in monosyllabic words that start with wau "و", e.g. wau "واو", wap "واڤ", wang "واڠ".

 It is also usually not omitted in root morphemes which first syllable is open and contains /e/ and which second syllable is closed and begins with /wa/, e.g. words with a /Ce.waC/ structure (where each C is a consonant) like lewah "ليواه", mewah "ميواه", dewan "ديوان", tewas " تيواس", rewang " ريواڠ", gewang "ݢواڠ", sewat "سيوات", kelewang "کليواڠ", kedewas "کديواس", dewangga "ديواڠݢ".

 Final alif "ا" is generally kept to represent /a/ [ə] at the end of a word.

 However, in native Malay disyllabic root morphemes with the form /Ca.C*a/ [Ca.C*ə], where /C*/ is any of the following 12 consonants ba "ب", ta "ت", pa "ڤ", sin "س", ga "ݢ", nun "ن", nya "ڽ", ca "چ", kaf "ک", jim "ج", mim "م" (mnemonic: betapa segannya cik jam "بتاڤ سݢنڽ چيق جم"), final alif "ا" is not written, e.g. raba "راب", mata "مات", sapa "ساڤ", rasa "راس", raga "راݢ", mana "مان", hanya "هاڽ", baca "باچ", raya "راي", baka "باک", raja "راج", nama "نام", sama "سام".

 Some native Malay trisyllabic root morphemes ending with /a/ [ə], with three open syllables and which include the abovementioned 12 consonants, may also omit the final alif "ا".

  As the final letter of a word, root morpheme-final /ə/ that is spelled with e in Rumi may be represented by ye "ى" in Jawi. In the middle of a word, root morpheme-final /ə/ that is spelled with e in Rumi may be represented by alif "ا" in Jawi instead, e.g. fatwa "فتوى" → memfatwakan "ممفتواکن", memetabolismekan "ممتابوليسماکن".
  The hamzah may be used to spell some diphthongs. Sources differ as to whether and when it should be on the line "ء", or placed above the previous mater lectionis, such as in alif with hamzah above "أ", or even if it should be used at all in some words.

 Furthermore, it may be used to represent a hiatus, or a glottal stop [ʔ], especially when (but not limited to) separating vowels at the boundary of a root morpheme and an affix, e.g. dato "داتو",  baik "بايق", mulai "مولاي", bau "باو", daun "داون", laut "لاوت", peperiksaan "ڤڤريقسان", kemerdekaan "کمرديکان", diambil "دأمبيل", dielakkan "دأيلقکن", diertikan "دأرتيکن", diikuti "دأيکوتي", diolah "دأوله", diutamakan "دأوتاماکن", keadaan "کأدان", keempat "کأمڤت", keindahan "کأيندهن", keupayaan "کأوڤايان", seakan-akan "سأکن-اکن", seekor "سأيکور", seorang "سأورڠ", e-mel "إي-ميل", eh! "إيه‮!‬", ateisme "اتيئيسمى", diet "ديئت".

 Arabic numerals are the preferred form for writing numerals in Jawi script, Eastern Arabic numerals are generally not used (except when indicating plural words, i.e. askar-askar = "عسکر٢").

 Full reduplication of base word is represented with the numeral "٢", e.g. anak-anak "انق٢",  while suffixed reduplication of base word is represented with the hypen "-", e.g. berhati-hati "برهاتي-هاتي", sayur-sayuran "سايور-سايورن", and gunung-ganang "ݢونوڠ-ݢانڠ".

Punctuation marks used in written Jawi are as follows:

Examples
Akin to the Arabic script, Jawi is constructed from right-to-left. Below is an exemplification of the Jawi script extracted from the first and second verse of the notable ,  (English: A Ghazal for Rabiah).

References

Further reading
 Hudson, Herbert Henry The Malay orthography (1892) Singapore, Kelly & Walsh.
 H.S. Paterson (& C.O. Blagden), 'An early Malay Inscription from 14th-century Terengganu', Journ. Mal. Br.R.A.S., II, 1924, pp. 258–263.
 R.O. Winstedt, A History of Malaya, revised ed. 1962, p. 40.
 J.G. de Casparis, Indonesian Paleography, 1975, p. 70–71.

External links
 Omniglot article about written Malay
 Software and articles related to Jawi
 Transliteration of Rumi to Jawi
 Book of Common Prayer in Jawi Script, digitized by Richard Mammana
 Jawi Transliteration Project | Southeast Asia Digital Library

Arabic alphabets
Indonesian scripts
Malay language
Jawi script